John Lee Ratcliffe (born October 20, 1965) is an American politician and attorney who served as the Director of National Intelligence from 2020 to 2021. He previously served as the U.S. representative for Texas's 4th district from 2015 to 2020. During his time in Congress, Ratcliffe was regarded as one of the most conservative members. Ratcliffe also served as Mayor of Heath, Texas, from 2004 to 2012 and as acting United States Attorney for the Eastern District of Texas from May 2007 to April 2008.

President Donald Trump announced on July 28, 2019, that he intended to nominate Ratcliffe to replace Dan Coats as Director of National Intelligence. Ratcliffe withdrew after Republican senators raised concerns about him, former intelligence officials said he might politicize intelligence, and media revealed Ratcliffe's embellishments regarding his prosecutorial experience in terrorism and immigration cases.

On February 28, 2020, President Trump announced that he would again nominate Ratcliffe to be Director of National Intelligence, and after Senate approval, he resigned from the House, and was sworn in on May 26. At his confirmation hearing, amid concerns that Ratcliffe would politicize the DNI, Ratcliffe pledged to be apolitical. However, during his tenure as DNI, Ratcliffe was regarded as using the DNI to score political points for Trump. Ratcliffe made public assertions that contradicted the intelligence community's own assessments, and sidelined career officials in the intelligence community.

Early life and education 
Born in Mount Prospect, Illinois, northwest of Chicago, Ratcliffe was the youngest of six children; both of his parents were teachers. He graduated from Carbondale Community High School in Carbondale, Illinois; from the University of Notre Dame in 1987 with a Bachelor of Arts in Government and International Studies; and the Southern Methodist University School of Law (now Dedman School of Law) with a Juris Doctor in 1989.

Career prior to Congress
After graduating from law school, Ratcliffe was a lawyer in private practice.

Ratcliffe was elected to four consecutive two-year terms as mayor of Heath, Texas, a city of about 7,000 people, 25 miles east of downtown Dallas. He served in that position from June 2004 to May 2012.

Eastern District of Texas 

In 2004, President George W. Bush appointed Ratcliffe to be the Chief of Anti-Terrorism and National Security for the Eastern District of Texas, within the U.S. Department of Justice. In May 2007, Ratcliffe was named interim U.S. Attorney for the district. Ratcliffe returned to private law practice when Rebecca Gregory was confirmed by the Senate as the permanent U.S. Attorney for the district in April 2008.

Ratcliffe's campaign website said that, as a federal prosecutor Ratcliffe "personally managed dozens of international and domestic terrorism investigations involving some of the nation’s most sensitive security matters" and "put terrorists in prison." There is, however, no evidence Ratcliffe ever prosecuted a terrorism case.

Ratcliffe also misrepresented his involvement in the U.S. v. Holy Land Foundation terrorism financing case, claiming “there are individuals that currently sit in prison because I prosecuted them for funneling money to terrorist groups." ABC News reported that there was no evidence in public court records that Ratcliffe was involved in the case, and that former officials and attorneys involved in the case could not recall that Ratcliffe was involved.

Ratcliffe's official House of Representatives biography says that while working as prosecutor for the Eastern District, he "arrested 300 illegal aliens in a single day". The Washington Post noted in a story about how Ratcliffe embellished his record that Ratcliffe played a supporting role in an effort to bust illegal immigrants and that his office arrested only 45 individuals suspected of being illegal immigrants (including two who turned out to be American citizens). Officials involved in the immigration enforcement dispute that Ratcliffe played a central role in the raid.

2009–2014 
In 2009, Ratcliffe became a partner with former Attorney General John Ashcroft in the law firm Ashcroft, Sutton, Ratcliffe.

In 2012, Ratcliffe was part of a transition team, established before that year's general election by Republican candidate Mitt Romney, to vet potential Presidential appointees.

U.S. House of Representatives

2014 election

In late 2013, Ratcliffe announced that he would run in the Republican primary against 17-term incumbent Congressman Ralph Hall of the 4th district. At 91, Hall was the oldest member of Congress and the oldest person ever to serve in the House of Representatives. The Dallas Morning News said that Ratcliffe was Hall's "most serious political challenge in years." No Democrat even filed, meaning that whoever won the primary would be all but assured of victory in November.

In a primary campaign during which Hall had begun to look increasingly vulnerable, Ratcliffe received the endorsement of the Dallas Morning News, which applauded Hall's long record of public service but cited Ratcliffe's "impressive credentials" and the need for "new ideas and fresh energy."

In the March 4 primary, Ratcliffe finished second with 29 percent of the vote, behind Hall's 45 percent. Because Hall came up short of a majority, a runoff election was required. For the May 27 runoff, Ratcliffe was endorsed by the Tea Party Express, the Senate Conservatives Fund, and the Club for Growth. Hall was endorsed by the National Rifle Association, former Congressman Ron Paul, former Congresswoman Michele Bachmann, and former Arkansas Governor Mike Huckabee. Ratcliffe defeated Hall with 53 percent of the vote, the first time in twenty years that a sitting Republican congressman in Texas had been ousted in a primary. Ratcliffe was one of four candidates to defeat a sitting incumbent U.S. representative in a primary election in 2014.

In the November 2014 general election, Ratcliffe ran unopposed. With a Cook Partisan Voting Index of R+25, it is the fifth most Republican district in Texas and is tied for the 13th most Republican in the nation.

2016 election

On March 1, 2016, Ratcliffe easily defeated two challengers in the Republican primary, getting 68 percent of the vote, 47 percentage points ahead of the second-place finisher. Once again, no Democrat filed to run in the November general election. In the general election, Ratcliffe defeated a third-party candidate with 88% of the vote.

2018 election

On November 6, 2018, Ratcliffe won re-election to a third term with nearly 76 percent of the vote, defeating Democratic challenger Catherine Krantz and Libertarian challenger Ken Ashby.

Tenure
When Ratcliffe took office on January 3, 2015; he became only the fifth person to represent the 4th District since its creation in 1903. All but one of his predecessors had held the seat for at least 25 years.

The Dallas Morning News said in April 2016 that "Ratcliffe's first term in Washington proves that freshman lawmakers can be players of consequence in Congress."

In a September 2016 hearing of the House Judiciary Committee, Ratcliffe questioned then-FBI Director James Comey about whether the FBI's decision not to recommend criminal charges against Hillary Clinton in connection with the email controversy came before or after Clinton was interviewed by investigations; Comey responded that the final decision had been made after the interviews. Ratcliffe subsequently suggested that the FBI had "predetermined the result" of the investigation.

Ratcliffe was a member of the Republican Study Committee and the Congressional NextGen 9-1-1 Caucus. In late 2018, Ratcliffe was reportedly considered for the role of Attorney General by the Trump Administration.

In a March 2019 tweet, Ratcliffe asserted that former FBI attorney Lisa Page had confirmed to him under oath that the Obama Justice Department had ordered the FBI to not consider gross negligence charges against Hillary Clinton regarding her handling of classified material. However, the June 2018 DOJ inspector general report on the matter stated that the DOJ's analysis of the relevant statute found that the FBI evidence for such a charge was lacking, and that interpretation was consistent with "prior cases under different leadership including in the 2008 decision not to prosecute former Attorney General Alberto Gonzales for mishandling classified documents." Analysts also noted that the FBI does not charge individuals, rather the DOJ does, as Page clarified to Ratcliffe later in her testimony, but which Ratcliffe did not mention in his tweet. Fox News extensively reported Ratcliffe's account of the matter, which Trump tweeted about minutes later.

Committee assignments 
During the 114th Congress (2015–2017), Ratcliffe sat on the Judiciary and Homeland Security committees, where he was a subcommittee chair on the House Homeland Security Subcommittee on Cybersecurity, Infrastructure Protection, and Security Technologies. During the 115th Congress (2017–19), Ratcliffe was a member of the Ethics, Judiciary, and Homeland Security committees. Within the Homeland Security Committee, he was a member of the subcommittee on Oversight and Management Efficiency and chaired the subcommittee on Cybersecurity and Infrastructure Protection. Within the Judiciary Committee, he was a member of the Subcommittee on Crime, Terrorism, Homeland Security and Investigations and vice chairman of the Subcommittee on Regulatory Reform, Commercial and Antitrust Law.

During the 116th Congress (2019), Ratcliffe sat on the Ethics, Judiciary and Intelligence Committees. Within the Judiciary Committee, Ratcliffe was the ranking member of the Subcommittee on Crime, Terrorism and Homeland Security and a member of the Subcommittee on Courts, Intellectual Property and the Internet. Within the Intelligence Committee, Ratcliffe was a member of the Strategic Technologies and Advanced Research Subcommittee and Intelligence and Modernization Readiness Subcommittee.

Assignment to President Trump's impeachment team 
On January 20, 2020, prior to the Senate impeachment trial, the Trump administration announced Ratcliffe as one of the congressional members of his impeachment team. Upon the announcement, Ratcliffe said, "I took an oath to defend the Constitution. This impeachment is an assault on due process. It’s an assault on the separation of powers. It's unconstitutional. I'm grateful for the opportunity to make that clear to every American during the Senate trial." Ratcliffe worked with the White House for several weeks prior to the Senate trial to prepare oral arguments and legal briefs. He was tapped for the position based on his legal background and effectiveness during impeachment proceedings in the House Intelligence and Judiciary committees.

Director of National Intelligence

Nomination

President Donald Trump announced on July 28, 2019, that he intended to nominate Ratcliffe to replace Dan Coats as Director of National Intelligence. Trump expressed confidence Ratcliffe could "rein in" intelligence agencies which he asserted had "run amok."

Ratcliffe has little experience in national security or national intelligence and is reported to have demonstrated little engagement on the matters as a congressman. Trump's intent to nominate Ratcliffe became controversial when he was found to have misrepresented his role in prosecuting terrorism and immigration cases.

Ratcliffe is well known for criticizing the FBI and the special counsel investigation as being biased against Trump. Ratcliffe has also alleged that Russian interference may have benefited Trump's 2016 rival candidate Hillary Clinton more than it benefited Trump. American intelligence agencies, the Senate Intelligence Committee and Robert Mueller have maintained that Russia interfered to help Trump. A week before Trump's announcement, Ratcliffe had argued that the special counsel investigation put Trump "below the law" because it declined to exonerate Trump. Later, Ratcliffe claimed on Fox News that the special counsel investigation's report was not written by special counsel Robert Mueller, but by "Hillary Clinton’s de facto legal team".

Democrats asserted Ratcliffe was unqualified and too partisan to serve in such a role, which is historically considered relatively nonpartisan. Some Republicans also privately expressed discontent with his selection and concerns about his ability to be confirmed. However, Senate Intelligence Committee Chairman Richard Burr and Senator John Cornyn expressed confidence in him. Democratic senators including Senate Minority Leader Chuck Schumer and Ron Wyden, a member of the Intelligence Committee, said that Ratcliffe's only qualification for the office appeared to be "blind loyalty" to Trump, noting that he has promoted some of Trump's conspiracy theories about the Russia investigation and has called for prosecution of Trump's political enemies. Several former members of the intelligence community expressed concerns that Ratcliffe's appointment risked politicizing intelligence work. They expressed fear that with Ratcliffe as DNI, Trump would in effect be assuming personal control over the intelligence community, which would then be expected to tell him only what he wants to hear. They stressed the need for intelligence to be "candid, truthful and accurate even if it is unpleasant and does not confirm to the biases of the president".

On August 2, 2019, Trump said in a tweet that he was withdrawing Ratcliffe's name from nomination, claiming that mainstream media scrutiny of Ratcliffe (though using the "lamestream" pejorative in the actual message) was unfair, and would result in "months of slander and libel," while White House sources said that Trump had become concerned about Ratcliffe's chances for confirmation, following feedback from some Republican senators. Speaking to reporters later that day, Trump insisted the press had treated Ratcliffe unfairly, but he also stated that he liked the way the press vetted his nominees, saying "You vet for me." In his formal statement withdrawing from consideration, Ratcliffe said, "I do not wish for a national security and intelligence debate surrounding my confirmation, however untrue, to become a purely political and partisan issue. The country we all love deserves that it be treated as an American issue. Accordingly, I have asked the President to nominate someone other than me for this position."

On February 28, 2020, President Donald Trump publicly announced Ratcliffe to be his nominee for Director of National Intelligence. On February 29, 2020, Sen. Mark Warner, vicechair of the Senate Intelligence Committee warned Trump against re-nominating Ratcliffe. The nomination came to the U.S. Senate on March 3, 2020. The U.S. Select Senate Committee on Intelligence held hearings on May 5, 2020, which started with a letter from former U.S. Attorney General John Ashcroft in favor of the nomination. U.S. Senator John Cornyn introduced Ratcliffe and supported his nomination. The Committee later voted in favor of the nomination on May 19, 2020.

Ratcliffe was confirmed by the Senate on May 21, 2020, by a vote of 49 to 44. He was sworn in on May 26.

2020 U.S. presidential election

Thirty-five days before the November 2020 election, Ratcliffe declassifed 2016 Russian disinformation that asserted Hillary Clinton had personally approved a scheme to associate Trump with Vladimir Putin and Russian hacking of the Democratic National Committee. Ratcliffe provided the disinformation to Senate Judiciary Committee Chairman Lindsey Graham, who publicly released it. The allegation had been previously rejected as baseless by the Republican-controlled Senate Intelligence Committee. Ratcliffe acknowledged in a letter to Graham that the intelligence community "does not know the accuracy of this allegation or the extent to which the Russian intelligence analysis may reflect exaggeration or fabrication." The intelligence community opposed the release of the information. According to the New York Times, Ratcliffe's disclosure "appeared to be a bid to help Mr. Trump politically."

Ratcliffe diverged from remarks prepared by the intelligence community regarding attempted election interference by Iran in the 2020 election. Ratcliffe said that the election interference was intended to "damage President Trump."

In November 2020, Trump secretly offered the job of U.S. attorney general to Ratcliffe, who turned the job down.

Political positions
Ratcliffe was considered one of the most conservative members of Congress. In 2016, The Heritage Foundation ranked Ratcliffe as the most conservative Texas legislator in Congress and second-most conservative legislator in the country.

China
Ratcliffe has called for China to be stripped of rights to hold the 2022 Winter Olympics because of what he says are "crimes of humanity against Uyghur Muslims" and alleging "a massive cover up of the (COVID-19) virus’s origins" and the "circumstances surrounding its initial outbreak".

Immigration
Ratcliffe supported President Donald Trump's 2017 executive order to prohibit immigration from seven predominantly Muslim countries, stating, "I applaud President Trump's actions to vamp up the vetting of refugees attempting to enter our country."

Term limits 
When he first ran for Congress, Ratcliffe said that term limits were a central part of his platform.

Cybersecurity 
Ratcliffe was chairman of the House Homeland Security Subcommittee on Cybersecurity and Infrastructure Protection during the 115th Congress (2017–19), when Republicans controlled the House.

In March 2014, Ratcliffe oversaw a congressional hearing, "The Current State of DHS Private Sector Engagement for Cybersecurity", that studied ways to get the private sector and the Department of Homeland Security to better cooperate to prevent terrorist activity. He secured testimony from various organizations: the Hitrust Alliance, Intel Security Group, Symantec, Palo Alto Networks, and New America's Open Technology Institute.

On December 16, 2016, Barack Obama signed Ratcliffe's H.R. 5877 "United States-Israel Advanced Research Partnership Act of 2016" into public law.  On November 2, 2017, Donald Trump signed Ratcliffe's H.R. 1616 "Strengthening State and Local Cyber Crime Fighting Act of 2017" into public law.

Net neutrality
In December 2017, Ratcliffe signed a letter from Congress, along with 106 other members of Congress, to Federal Communications Commission Chairman Ajit Pai, supporting Pai's plan to repeal net neutrality.

Russia probe 

Ratcliffe has staunchly supported Trump's criticism of the investigations into Russian interference in the 2016 United States elections, in particular the origins of the investigation, contending "it does appear that there were crimes committed during the Obama administration." Ratcliffe has stated that he has "seen no evidence" that Russian interference in the 2016 election helped get Trump elected. He has described court-approved surveillance of the Trump campaign as spying. He has claimed without evidence that the Russia probe may have been tainted by a criminal conspiracy.

Days before he was announced as Trump's choice to be Director of National Intelligence, Ratcliffe drew headlines for his questioning of Robert Mueller during Mueller's congressional testimony. Ratcliffe criticized Mueller for describing instances of obstruction of justice in his report on Russian interference in the 2016 election. Ratcliffe claimed that Mueller went beyond the rules for special counsels, by covering instances of potential obstruction when the report did not charge any crimes. The Associated Press and PolitiFact found Ratcliffe's claim false, noting that special prosecutors are required by federal regulations to explain decisions not to prosecute. Neal Katyal, who wrote the special counsel regulations in 1999, called Ratcliffe "dead wrong."

Ratcliffe also falsely claimed that the Steele dossier, which he described as a "fake, phony dossier", was the trigger that started the Trump-Russia probe. The House Republican intelligence committee's own memo about the Russia probe had said that it was information about George Papadopoulos that set off an investigation by the FBI in July 2016. Ratcliffe also asserted that Democrats "accused Donald Trump of a crime and then tried to reverse engineer a process to justify that accusation." Trump was reportedly impressed by Ratcliffe's aggressive questioning of Mueller, which some sources described as Ratcliffe's "audition" to be named DNI.

Shortly before Trump announced he would be nominated as DNI, Ratcliffe asserted the Obama administration had committed a felony by leaking classified transcripts of 2016 phone calls between Michael Flynn and Russian ambassador Sergey Kislyak to The Washington Post. The gist of the conversations were conveyed to Post reporters, but not the transcripts themselves. He also asserted, "The Mueller report and its conclusions weren’t from Robert Mueller. They were written by what a lot of people believe was Hillary Clinton’s de facto legal team, people that had supported her, even represented some of her aides." Three days after becoming DNI in May 2020, Ratcliffe declassified and released the full transcripts, which may have made it more difficult for prosecutors to assert the earlier reporting about the gist of the calls had harmed national security.

Ratcliffe said that he had seen a text message between FBI employees Peter Strzok and Lisa Page that referenced a "secret society," adding, "We learned today about information that in the immediate aftermath of his election, there may have been a 'secret society' of folks within the Department of Justice and the FBI, to include Page and Strzok, working against [Trump]." His assertion briefly went viral on pro-Trump media, and the next day Republican senator Ron Johnson claimed that Republican investigators had learned from an "informant" of meetings of a "secret society." The text message did contain the expression "secret society," but it was soon learned to be a joke related to Strzok's purchase of "beefcake" calendars of Vladimir Putin for distribution to FBI employees who had worked on the Russian investigation.

Personal life
Ratcliffe and his wife, Michele, live with their two daughters in Heath, Texas.

See also
 Final Report of the Task Force on Combating Terrorist and Foreign Fighter Travel

References

External links
 Director of National Intelligence biography

 
 
 Money-in-Politics profile from OpenSecrets.org

|-

1965 births
21st-century American politicians
Dedman School of Law alumni
Living people
Mayors of places in Texas
People from Heath, Texas
People from Mount Prospect, Illinois
Rejected or withdrawn nominees to the United States Executive Cabinet
Republican Party members of the United States House of Representatives from Texas
Texas lawyers
Trump administration cabinet members
United States Attorneys for the Eastern District of Texas
United States Directors of National Intelligence
University of Notre Dame alumni